Q2 or Q-2 may refer to:
 The second quarter of a calendar year (April, May, June) or fiscal year
 The second quarto of William Shakespeare's works
 Q2 (statistics), the second quartile in descriptive statistics (i.e. the median)
 Q2 Stadium, a sports stadium in Austin, Texas
 Quake II, first person shooter game developed by id Software and distributed by Activision
 Quran 2, al-baqarah, the 2nd chapter of the Islamic Holy book
 Leica Q2, a digital camera
A mechanical siren manufactured by Federal Sign & Signal. The "Q" class of siren is the largest electromechanical siren made by Federal. It used to be used on ambulances and fire trucks because of the extreme sound output. Now it is primarily used by fire trucks because of the power consumption. Other emergency vehicles now use electronic sirens.

Media and broadcasting
 KZJO, a television station in Seattle, Washington, United States, which formerly held the call sign KMYQ and was known on air as "MyQ²"
 KTVQ, a television station in Billings, Montana, United States known on air as "Q2"
 Q2, a Belgian television station
 Q2, a short-lived spinoff network of QVC in the 1990s
 Q2, a Star Trek character played by Corbin Bernsen
 "Q2", an episode of Star Trek: Voyager
 Q2, a contemporary classical music internet radio station “devoted to the music of living composers” run by New York's WQXR

Transportation
 Air Cargo Carriers, a cargo airline with the IATA code 2Q
 PRR Q2, a class of steam locomotive
 Metrobus route Q2, a bus route in Washington, D.C.
 Q2 (New York City bus)
 Alfa Romeo's limited slip differential
 Audi Q2, a mini SUV by German manufacturer

See also
02 (disambiguation)
2Q (disambiguation)